Melissa Hart (born 1969/1970) is a justice of the Colorado Supreme Court.

Biography
Hart was born to Phyllis Cox, a lawyer specializing in human rights, and Robert C. Hart, a business executive in the energy industry. In 1991, Hart received a Bachelor of Arts from Harvard University, where she wrote for The Harvard Crimson, and her Juris Doctor magna cum laude from Harvard Law School in 1995, where she received the Sears Prize, was an Articles Editor of the Harvard Law Review, and was a member of the winning team in the 1994 Ames Moot Court Competition. After law school, she clerked for Judge Guido Calabresi of the United States Court of Appeals for the Second Circuit, and then for Justice John Paul Stevens of the Supreme Court of the United States from 1996 to 1997.

Following her clerkships, she worked as a litigation attorney for the U.S. Department of Justice in Washington, D.C. In 2001, she became an Associate Professor of Law at the University of Colorado Law School, and was later named the Schaden Chair and Professor of Law and director of the Byron R. White Center for the Study of American Constitutional Law. She is an expert on employment discrimination law.

On December 14, 2017, Gov. John Hickenlooper named Hart as an associate justice of the Colorado Supreme Court, replacing Allison H. Eid. After serving for the remainder of Eid's term, Hart stood for election to a full ten-year term in 2020, which she won.

Personal life
On June 2, 2001, Hart married Kevin Thomas Traskos, who is also an attorney. She is the granddaughter of Archibald Cox.

See also

 List of law clerks of the Supreme Court of the United States (Seat 4)

References

Selected publications
 Hart (with Maria Ontiveros, Roberto Corrada, and Michael Selmi), Employment Discrimination Law: Cases and Material on Equality in the Workplace (Thomson/West, 10th ed. 2016). .

External links
 Bio, University of Colorado Law School.
 Appearances on C-Span.org.

1960s births
Living people
20th-century American lawyers
21st-century American lawyers
21st-century American women judges
21st-century American judges
Place of birth missing (living people)
American scholars of constitutional law
Colorado lawyers
Justices of the Colorado Supreme Court

Law clerks of the Supreme Court of the United States
Harvard Law School alumni
The Harvard Crimson people
University of Colorado faculty
University of Colorado Law School faculty
American women legal scholars
American legal scholars
Harvard College alumni